Vicarello may refer to:

Places 
Vicarello, Bracciano, a village in the metropolitan city of Rome, Italy
Vicarello, Collesalvetti, a village in the province of Livorno, Italy

Other uses 
Castle of Vicarello, a castle in Cinigiano, province of Grosseto, Tuscany
Vicarello Cups, archaeological finds from Vicarello, Bracciano